Pitt B. Herington (February 5, 1841 - January 15, 1919) was a Union Army soldier in the American Civil War who received the U.S. military's highest decoration, the Medal of Honor.

Herington was born in Michigan on February 5, 1841, and entered service at Tipton, Iowa. He was awarded the Medal of Honor, for extraordinary heroism on June 15, 1864, while serving as a Private with Company E, 11th Iowa Volunteer Infantry Regiment, at Kennesaw Mountain, Georgia. His Medal of Honor was issued, on November 27, 1899.

He died at the age of 77, on January 15, 1919, and was buried at the Memorial Park Cemetery in Clinton, Illinois.

Medal of Honor citation

Notes

References

External links

1841 births
1919 deaths
Burials in Illinois
Union Army soldiers
United States Army Medal of Honor recipients
American Civil War recipients of the Medal of Honor